George Rector Nethercutt Jr. (born October 7, 1944) is an American lawyer, author, and politician. Nethercutt is the founder and chairman of The George Nethercutt Foundation. He was a Republican member of the United States House of Representatives from 1995 to 2005, representing .

Early life
Born in Spokane, Washington, and a graduate of North Central High School, Nethercutt earned a B.A. in English from Washington State University in 1967 and a J.D. degree from Gonzaga University in 1971. He worked as a clerk for Alaskan federal Judge Raymond Plummer. Nethercutt then served as staff counsel and later chief of staff to Senator Ted Stevens (R-AK) from 1972 to 1977 before returning to private practice in Washington State.

He formerly served as a town attorney for the communities of Reardan, Creston and Almira. He is a former chair of the Spokane County Republican Party. He is the co-founder of the Vanessa Behan Crisis Nursery.

Congressional career
Nethercutt was first elected to Congress in 1994 in a dramatic election in which he unseated the Speaker of the House, Tom Foley.  It was the first time he had run for office.  The district had been growing more conservative since the early 1980s, but Foley had held on mainly by running up his totals in Democratic-leaning Spokane.  In the 1994 election, however, Nethercutt ran up his totals in the more rural areas of the district while holding Foley to a margin of only 9,000 votes in Spokane and 3,000 in Spokane County, which allowed him to prevail by 4,000 votes.  This marked the first time a sitting Speaker of the House was unseated since 1862, and was part of a massive national Republican landslide that saw the GOP take control of the House for the first time in 40 years. In Congress, he sat on the House Appropriations Committee and the House Science Committee. Like most Republicans elected in the 1994 wave, he had a strongly conservative voting record.

Nethercutt's campaign against Foley, a 30-year incumbent, included significant attention to Foley's opposition to term limits. In 1992, Washington state voters had approved a ballot measure limiting the terms of Washington officials, including federal officials such as U.S. Representatives. Foley brought suit contesting the constitutionality of this limit and won in court. Nethercutt repeatedly cited the caption of Foley's lawsuit – "Foley against the People of the State of Washington."  He also promised to serve no more than three terms (six years) in the House.

In the 1996 elections, the Democrats mounted a serious bid to regain the seat, but Nethercutt won by an unexpectedly large 12-point margin even as Bill Clinton narrowly carried the district.  He was handily reelected in 1998. In 2000, when his self-imposed three-term limit would have kicked in, Nethercutt changed his mind and announced his intention to run again, infuriating term-limits supporters. Nethercutt was nevertheless re-elected without much difficulty in 2000 and in 2002.

Nethercutt's congressional papers are held at Gonzaga University.

2004 Senate race

Rather than running for a sixth term in the House of Representatives, Nethercutt decided to run for U.S. Senate in 2004, hoping to unseat the incumbent, Senator Patty Murray. Term limits again became an issue in the campaign, as Democrats quickly seized on Nethercutt's broken term-limits pledge.

Nethercutt was also hampered by his lack of name recognition in the more densely populated western part of the state, home to two-thirds of the state's population. Washington has not elected a senator from east of the Cascades since Clarence Dill in 1928. Other important issues included national security and the war in Iraq. Nethercutt supported the invasion of Iraq, while Murray opposed it.

Nethercutt was a heavy underdog from the start, and his campaign never gained much traction. In November, he lost by 12 points, receiving 43 percent of the vote to Murray's 55 percent. While he dominated the eastern portion of the state, including his own congressional district, he only won two counties west of the Cascades, Clark County and Lewis County.

Post-congressional career

Nethercutt left the House of Representatives at the end of his term in January 2005, but said that he would probably not completely retire from politics. In 2005, he and two other political veterans (former Interior Department deputy secretary J. Steven Griles and former White House national energy policy director Andrew Lundquist) formed the political lobbying firm of Lundquist, Nethercutt & Griles, LLC. Griles resigned in 2007, after he pleaded guilty to obstruction of justice in connection with the Abramoff scandal, the top Bush administration official to do so.

Nethercutt serves as Chairman of Nethercutt Consulting LLC, is of counsel for the law firms of Bluewater Strategies and Lee & Hayes, and is a member of several corporate boards.  He is the author of the book In Tune with America: Our History in Song, writes a monthly column for The Pacific Northwest Inlander newspaper, and records radio commentaries for several radio stations.

Nethercutt is also a board member on the Dutch board of JDRF (Juvenile Diabetes Research Foundation).

The Nethercutt Foundation
Nethercutt has founded The George Nethercutt Foundation in Spokane, Washington. The Foundation is a nonpartisan nonprofit organization dedicated to fostering civic involvement.  The foundation accepts applications from college students who aspire to be Nethercutt Fellows.  The Nethercutt Fellowship involves, among other things, a trip to Washington, D.C. where fellows have the opportunity to see the inner-workings of the United States government.

Electoral history

References

External links
 
 
 George Nethercutt on the Issues
 The Nethercutt Foundation website
 Nethercutt's columns in The Pacific Northwest Inlander

1944 births
Living people
Politicians from Spokane, Washington
American Presbyterians
Political chiefs of staff
Washington (state) lawyers
Washington State University alumni
Gonzaga University School of Law alumni
Harvard Institute of Politics
Republican Party members of the United States House of Representatives from Washington (state)
United States congressional aides
20th-century American politicians
21st-century American politicians
Members of Congress who became lobbyists